Iluppaiyurani is a panchayat town in Thoothukudi district in the Indian state of Tamil Nadu.

Demographics
 India census, Iluppaiyurani had a population of 11,843. Males constitute 50% of the population and females 50%. Iluppaiyurani has an average literacy rate of 72%, higher than the national average of 59.5%: male literacy is 78%, and female literacy is 65%. In Iluppaiyurani, 10% of the population is under 6 years of age.

References

Cities and towns in Thoothukudi district